The Men's 400m freestyle event at the 2010 South American Games was held on March 27, with the heats at 10:48 and the Final at 18:15.

Medalists

Records

Results

Heats

Final

References
Heats
Final

Free 400m M